Guilbaut Colas (born 18 June 1983) is a French Mogul skier who competed in the 2006 Winter Olympics and has seven World Cup victories. Born in Échirolles, Colas competed in the 2010 Winter Olympics in Men's Moguls. Although he had the best time his "air score" was not as good and he finished sixth overall.

References 

1983 births
Living people
People from Échirolles
French male freestyle skiers
Olympic freestyle skiers of France
Freestyle skiers at the 2006 Winter Olympics
Freestyle skiers at the 2010 Winter Olympics
Sportspeople from Isère